Clyde Eathan Davids (born 17 April 1993) is a South African professional rugby union player who last played for the  in the Currie Cup. His regular position is number eight or flanker.

Career

Youth

Davids got his first provincial call-up in 2011, when he was selected to represent  at the Craven Week, the premier high school rugby union competition in South Africa. He made two appearances at the tournament held in Kimberley.

Davids made the move to Pretoria to join the  academy for 2012. Six of those appearances came during the round-robin stage of the competition as the Blue Bulls finished in second position on the log to qualify for the semi-finals.

In 2013, Davids was promoted to the  squad and he appeared in eleven of their fourteen matches in the 2013 Under-21 Provincial Championship, starting ten of those. He made eight starts and one appearance off the bench during the regular season to help the Blue Bulls finish in second spot on the log, winning eight of their twelve matches.

Blue Bulls

He eventually started all nine of their matches in the competition – scoring one more try in their 116–0 victory over the  – as the Blue Bulls progressed to the semi-finals of the competition where they lost 15–16 to the Golden Lions.

Davids reverted to the  side for the 2014 Under-21 Provincial Championship and scored a try in their match against  as his side secured second spot on the log. He started in their semi-final match, a 23–19 victory over the Golden Lions, but missed out on the final, which saw the Blue Bulls U21 win the competition after beating  20–10 in Cape Town.

In 2015, Davids was included in Pretoria-based university side ' squad for the 2015 Varsity Cup. He appeared in all eight of their matches in the competition and scored four tries (one less than UP Tuks' joint top scorers Dan Kriel and Wiaan Liebenberg), scoring in matches against ,  and  during the regular season, as well as in their semi-final, as UP Tuks suffered a 28–29 defeat to NWU Pukke to be knocked out of the competition.

References

South African rugby union players
Living people
1993 births
Sportspeople from Paarl
Rugby union flankers
Rugby union number eights
Blue Bulls players
Rugby union players from the Western Cape